The Ritz-Carlton Grand Cayman is a luxury hotel in Georgetown, Cayman Islands, operated by the Ritz-Carlton Hotel Company. It lies on Seven Mile Beach. The hotel was nominated for the Caribbean's Leading Hotel Residences and the Caribbean's Leading Hotel Suite in 2013 at the 20th World Travel Awards.

The luxury resort hotel is set in an area of 144 acres that extends from Seven Mile Beach, a stretch of pure white sand along the Caribbean waters, to the North Sound. The hotel comprises two buildings set on either side of the boulevard that runs parallel to the Seven Mile Beach. The link between the two wings is provided by a catwalk which is climatically monitored and is sound proof, and the catwalk runs over the busy thoroughfare. The hotel also encompasses a golf course, designed by Greg Norman.

Architecture and facilities
The Ritz-Carlton is a three-storey building, opened in early 2006. It is reported to be the largest building on the island and built contravening the building rules of the island; it has thus generated controversy. The hotel has 363 rooms and suites and 69 residences.

The Ritz-Carlton consists of two main buildings: the Waterway, which contains the lobby, restaurants, spa and guest rooms opposite the lagoon, and a separate a U-shaped complex of residential suites around a pool and restaurants, facing the ocean. The corridor is long and forms the art gallery, featuring display pedestals showing artifacts made by local craftsman. The main Waterway building contains the hotel lobby and concierge, the Silver Palm Lounge, Taikun and Blue by Eric Reipert on the 3rd floor. It also contains the Silver Rain La Prairie Spa, a ballroom, and the "Garden View" and "Resort View" rooms. The lagoon and garden is to the east of this and contains the Blue Tip Golf Course (nine hole), designed by Greg Norman, and three clay tennis courts and one grass court designed by Nick Bollettieri. The  ballroom can be divided into three smaller rooms. The terrace adjoining it has further space of 4600 square feet, which can accommodate more guests spilling from the ballroom.

The hotel has 24 residential suites, ranging from one to three bedrooms. The largest and most expensive is the  Ritz-Carlton Suite overlooking the ocean, which as of 2006 cost $5,000 a night. Ocean Front Club Room, of the same size, overlooks the beach. Many of the rooms are furnished in Italian linens and marble tables, with rattan chairs on the balconies.

References

External links
Official site

Hotels in the Cayman Islands
Buildings and structures in George Town, Cayman Islands
Grand Cayman
Hotels established in 2006
Hotel buildings completed in 2006